John Joseph Pesch (20 July 1921 – 10 January 2010) was a senior officer in the United States Air Force who served as director of the Air National Guard from 20 April 1974 to 31 January 1977. He served in World War II, and was a young pilot  on 23 March 1944, when German fighters shot out two engines on the left side of his B-17 during a bombing raid. Eight members of the crew bailed out, leaving Pesch and his co-pilot, J. C. Amley, to successfully land the aircraft.

Major General John J. Pesch Flight Safety Trophy
Pesch is remembered each time his "Flight Safety Trophy" is awarded to an organization.
 157th Air Refueling Wing
 135th Airlift Group
 119th Wing (Awarded Trophy in 2003, 2002, and 2000)

Major awards and decorations

    Air Force Distinguished Service Medal
    Legion of Merit
    Distinguished Flying Cross (United States) with one Oak Leaf Cluster
    Meritorious Service Medal
    Air Medal with three Oak Leaf Clusters.
    Air Force Commendation Medal
    Presidential Unit Citation (United States)
    World War II Victory Medal (United States)
    Army of Occupation Medal
    National Defense Service Medal

Notes

External links
 42-38157 Four Freedoms – Mission #21 Target: Brunswick 23 March 1944
 Air National Guard Instruction 36-2802
 Maine Obituaries
 Former ANG director passes away at 88

United States Air Force generals
Recipients of the Legion of Merit
United States Air National Guard
1921 births
2010 deaths
Recipients of the Air Medal
Recipients of the Distinguished Flying Cross (United States)
National Guard (United States) generals
People from Maspeth, Queens
People from Sterling, Virginia
United States Army Air Forces pilots of World War II